Srinivas Aluru is a professor in the School of Computational Science and Engineering at Georgia Institute of Technology, and co-Executive Director for the Georgia Tech Interdisciplinary Research Institute in Data Engineering and Science. Aluru is a Fellow of the American Association for the Advancement of Science (AAAS) and the Institute for Electrical and Electronic Engineers (IEEE). He is best known for his research contributions in parallel algorithms and applications, interdisciplinary research in bioinformatics and computational biology, and particularly the intersection of these two fields.

Education
Aluru completed his B.Tech in computer science at the Indian Institute of Technology Madras in the year 1989. He then received M.S. and Ph.D. degrees in computer science in 1991 and 1994, both from Iowa State University. His doctoral thesis was "Distribution-independent hierarchical N-body methods”.

Career and research
Aluru began his career in 1991 as a research assistant at Ames Laboratory. After earning Ph.D., he briefly worked at Syracuse University as a visiting assistant professor before joining as an assistant professor in the Dept. of Computer Science at New Mexico State University. In 1999, he returned to his alma mater to serve as a faculty member in the Electrical and Computer Engineering Department. At Iowa State, he held Stanley Chair in Interdisciplinary Engineering (2006–2009) and the Mehl Professorship (2009–2013). He chaired the interdepartmental bioinformatics program (2005–2007) and served as associate chair for research and graduate education in the ECE department (2003–2006). He won several university research awards including early career, mid-career, and outstanding research achievement awards, and led research in high performance computing and bioinformatics. In 2013, he shifted to the School of Computational Science and Engineering at Georgia Institute of Technology.

Aluru's research focus has centered around contributions to parallel algorithms and bioinformatics, particularly genomics. He pioneered the development of parallel methods in computational biology, and development of algorithms and software for high-throughput DNA sequencing analysis and its applications. In this context, some of his group's work led to the development of fundamental string algorithms, particularly for constructing suffix arrays and algorithms for approximate sequence matching. He also solved the open problem of computing string edit distance or biological sequence alignments in optimal time and space. He collaborated with domain scientists on several high impact projects, including sequencing of the maize genome, finding novel genes in maize, and uncovering genetic mechanisms that underlie growth and drought response in plants.

An early pioneer in big data, Aluru led one of the eight inaugural mid-scale NSF-NIH Big Data projects awarded in the first round of federal big data investments in 2012. He has contributed to NITRD and OSTP led white house workshops, and NSF and DOE led efforts to create and nurture big data research. He led the efforts to create the NSF South Big Data Regional Innovation Hub, that nurtures big data partnerships between organizations in the 16 U.S. Southern States and Washington, D.C.

Awards
 Fellow, American Association for the Advancement of Science
 Fellow, Institute for Electrical and Electronics Engineers (IEEE) and IEEE Computer Society

Selected publications

References

Year of birth missing (living people)
Living people
Fellows of the American Association for the Advancement of Science
Georgia Tech faculty
Fellow Members of the IEEE